West Virginia Route 26 is a north–south state highway located within Preston County in the U.S. state of West Virginia. The southern terminus of the route is at U.S. Route 50 in Fellowsville. The northern terminus is at the Pennsylvania state line northeast of Glade Farms, where WV 26 continues as Pennsylvania Route 281.

Major intersections

References

026
Transportation in Preston County, West Virginia